Donald Henry Northcote, FRS (27 December 1921 – 7 January 2004)  was a 20th-century British academic.

Life 
Northcote was educated at Sir George Monoux Grammar School (1933–38). He graduated from University of London.

He was  a Lecturer in Plant Biochemistry at the University of Cambridge; then Reader from 1965 to 1972; and Professor from 1972 to 1989. He was also an Honorary Fellow of Downing College, Cambridge.

References

External links
 obituary from the Cambridge University Reporter

1921 births
2004 deaths
Fellows of St John's College, Cambridge
Masters of Sidney Sussex College, Cambridge
Fellows of the Royal Society
People educated at Sir George Monoux College